Singapore competed at the 2017 World Aquatics Championships in Budapest, Hungary from 14 July to 30 July.

Medalists

Diving

Singapore has entered 4 divers (three male and one female).

Men

Women

Mixed

Swimming

Singaporean swimmers have achieved qualifying standards in the following events (up to a maximum of 2 swimmers in each event at the A-standard entry time, and 1 at the B-standard):

Synchronized swimming

Singapore's synchronized swimming team consisted of 8 athletes (8 female).

Women

References

Nations at the 2017 World Aquatics Championships
Singapore at the World Aquatics Championships
2017 in Singaporean sport